The Tenino Stone Company Quarry, at City Park in Tenino, Washington, was listed on the National Register of Historic Places in 1983.

It is also known as the Memorial Swimming Pool. It is used as a swimming and diving pool.

References

External links

Swimming pools
Quarries in the United States
National Register of Historic Places in Thurston County, Washington